This is a list of string theory topics.

String theory 

 Strings
 Nambu–Goto action
 Polyakov action
 Bosonic string theory
 Superstring theory
 Type I string
 Type II string
 Type IIA string theory
 Type IIB string theory
 Heterotic string
 N=2 superstring
 M-theory
 Matrix theory
 Introduction to M-theory
 F-theory
 String field theory
 Matrix string theory
 Nonlinear sigma model
 Tachyon condensation
 RNS formalism
 String theory landscape
 History of string theory
 First superstring revolution
 Second superstring revolution

String duality 

 T-duality
 S-duality
 U-duality
 Montonen–Olive duality
 Mysterious duality

Particles and fields 

 Graviton
 Dilaton
 Tachyon
 Ramond–Ramond field
 Kalb–Ramond field
 Magnetic monopole

Branes 

 D-brane
 S-brane
 Black brane
 Black holes
 Black string
 Brane cosmology
 Quiver diagram
 Hanany–Witten transition

Supersymmetry 

 Supergravity
 Superspace
 Lie superalgebra
 Lie supergroup

Conformal field theory 

 Two-dimensional conformal field theory
 Virasoro algebra
 Mirror symmetry
 Conformal anomaly
 Conformal algebra
 Superconformal algebra
 Vertex operator algebra
 Loop algebra
 Kac–Moody algebra
 Wess–Zumino–Witten model
 Monstrous moonshine

Geometry 

 Kaluza–Klein theory
 Compactification
 Why 10 dimensions?
 Kähler manifold
 Ricci-flat manifold
 Calabi–Yau manifold
 Hyperkähler manifold
 K3 surface
 G2 manifold
 Spin(7) manifold
 Generalized complex manifold
 Orbifold
 Conifold
 Orientifold
 Moduli space
 Hořava–Witten domain wall
 K-theory (physics)
 Twisted K-theory

Holography 

 Holographic principle
 AdS/CFT correspondence

Gauge theory 

 Anomalies
 Instantons
 Chern–Simons form
 Bogomol'nyi–Prasad–Sommerfield bound
 Exceptional Lie groups
 G2, F4, E6, E7, E8
 ADE classification
 Dirac string
 P-form electrodynamics

People 

 Mina Aganagić
 Daniele Amati
 Amir Amini
 Husam Qutteina 
 Nima Arkani-Hamed
 Paul S. Aspinwall
 Michael Francis Atiyah
 Tom Banks
 David Berenstein
 Jan de Boer
 Raphael Bousso
 Robert Brandenberger
 Curtis Callan
 Gerald Cleaver
 Eugène Cremmer
 Atish Dabholkar
 Emilio Del Giudice
 Paolo Di Vecchia
 Robbert Dijkgraaf
 Michael Dine
 Jacques Distler
 Louise Dolan
 Michael Douglas
 Michael Duff
 Giorgi Dvali
 Sergio Ferrara
 Willy Fischler
 Daniel Friedan
 Rajesh Gopakumar
 Sylvester James Gates
 Michael Green
 Brian Greene
 David Gross
 Steven Gubser
 Sergei Gukov
 Alan Guth
 Jeffrey Harvey
 Petr Hořava
 Tasneem Zehra Husain
 Gary Gibbons
 Michio Kaku
 Renata Kallosh
 Theodor Kaluza
 Anton Kapustin
 Igor Klebanov
 Oskar Klein
 Juan Martín Maldacena
 Donald Marolf
 Emil Martinec
 Shiraz Minwalla
 Gregory Moore
 Luboš Motl
 Sunil Mukhi
 Robert Myers
 K. S. Narain
 Horațiu Năstase
 Nikita Nekrasov
 André Neveu
 Dimitri Nanopoulos
 Holger Bech Nielsen
 Peter van Nieuwenhuizen
 David Olive
 Hirosi Ooguri
 Burt Ovrut 
 Joseph Polchinski
 Alexander Polyakov
 Arvind Rajaraman
 Lisa Randall
 Seifallah Randjbar-Daemi
 Martin Rocek
 John H. Schwarz
 Nathan Seiberg
 Ashoke Sen
 Suvankar Dutta
 Samson Shatashvili
 Steve Shenker
 Warren Siegel
 Eva Silverstein
 Matthias Staudacher
 Paul Steinhardt
 Andrew Strominger
 Leonard Susskind
 Charles Thorn
 Paul Townsend
 Sandip Trivedi
 Neil Turok
 Cumrun Vafa
 Gabriele Veneziano
 Erik Verlinde
 Herman Verlinde
 Edward Witten
 Tamiaki Yoneya
 Alexander Zamolodchikov
 Alexei Zamolodchikov
 Barton Zwiebach

See also

Glossary of string theory

List 
String theory
String theory